The Lone Wolf in Paris is a 1938 American film, one of Columbia's Lone Wolf film series.

In the start-and-stop history of the Lone Wolf series, this entry is the only one with Lederer as star.  It stands alone between Melvyn Douglas's The Lone Wolf Returns in 1935, and the first of Warren William's series of nine, The Lone Wolf Spy Hunt, released the following year.

Cast 

 Francis Lederer as Michael Lanyard/The Lone Wolf
 Frances Drake as Princess Thania of Arvonne
 Olaf Hytten as Jenkins
 Walter Kingsford as Grand Duke Gregor de Meyerson
 Leona Maricle as Baroness Cambrell
 Albert Dekker as Marquis Louis de Meyerson
 Maurice Cass as Alfonse Fromont, hotel manager
 Bess Flowers as Davna
 Ruth Robinson as The Queen of Arvonne
 Pio Peretti as Prince Paul of Arvonne
 Eddie Fetherston as Mace, henchman

External links 
 

1938 films
1938 drama films
American black-and-white films
1930s English-language films
Columbia Pictures films
American drama films
Films set in Paris
The Lone Wolf films
Films directed by Albert S. Rogell
1930s American films